Mamaku is a small village in the Bay of Plenty Region of the North Island of New Zealand.

History
Mamaku was originally called Kaponga, but the name was changed to Mamaku in 1890 to avoid confusion with the town of Kaponga in Taranaki. Ironically, the plant known as Mamaku, the Black tree fern, is not found in the area. European settlement commenced in the 1880s, and for a time Mamaku rivalled Rotorua for size.

The main industry in Mamaku was originally native timber logging. In the late 19th century and early 20th century Mamaku had, at one time, 5 timber mills, all logging native timber from the surrounding bush. This reduced over time and today there are no timber mills operating in the village, with the last mill ceasing operations on 31 March 2015.

Another major industry established in Mamaku was farming, primarily dairy and sheep. This continues today as perhaps the main source of income for the village. Some recent additions to local industry include blueberry winemaking and off-road biking.

Demographics
Mamaku is part of the larger Ngongotahā Valley statistical area.

Mamaku had a population of 840 at the 2018 New Zealand census, an increase of 153 people (22.3%) since the 2013 census, and an increase of 114 people (15.7%) since the 2006 census. There were 267 households, comprising 399 males and 435 females, giving a sex ratio of 0.92 males per female, with 234 people (27.9%) aged under 15 years, 135 (16.1%) aged 15 to 29, 387 (46.1%) aged 30 to 64, and 81 (9.6%) aged 65 or older.

Ethnicities were 79.3% European/Pākehā, 36.8% Māori, 2.9% Pacific peoples, 2.9% Asian, and 1.8% other ethnicities. People may identify with more than one ethnicity.

Although some people chose not to answer the census's question about religious affiliation, 62.9% had no religion, 23.9% were Christian, 1.1% had Māori religious beliefs and 2.1% had other religions.

Of those at least 15 years old, 45 (7.4%) people had a bachelor's or higher degree, and 162 (26.7%) people had no formal qualifications. 33 people (5.4%) earned over $70,000 compared to 17.2% nationally. The employment status of those at least 15 was that 285 (47.0%) people were employed full-time, 81 (13.4%) were part-time, and 45 (7.4%) were unemployed.

Education

The school opened in the village in 1895.

References
 New Zealand 1:50000 Topographic Map Series sheet BE36 - Mamaku

Rotorua Lakes District
Populated places in the Bay of Plenty Region
Populated places in Waikato